Paraskevas Tsantalis (alternate spellings: Paraschos, Chandalis, Chantalis) is a retired Greek professional basketball player and coach. He played with Panellinios and Olympiacos in the Greek Basket League, and also represented the Greek national team at the senior level. He played at the small forward position.

Professional career
Tsantalis played club basketball in the Greek Basket League with Panellinios. He was the Greek Basket League's top scorer in the 1970–71 season. On 28 March 1971, he scored 73 points in a single Greek League game between Panellinios and Panionios. That is the second most points ever scored in a single game of the top-tier level Greek League. In 1976, while playing with Olympiacos, Tsantalis won both the Greek League championship and the Greek Cup title.

National team career
Tsantalis played in 5 games with the senior Greek national basketball team.

Coaching career
After he retired from playing club basketball, Tsantalis became a basketball coach.

See also
 Most points scored in a Greek Basket League game

References

External links
Hellenic Basketball Federation Profile 

Year of birth missing (living people)
Living people
Greek basketball coaches
Greek Basket League players
Greek men's basketball players
Olympiacos B.C. players
Panellinios B.C. players
Small forwards